Adrián Maximiliano Nario (born September 12, 1976), also known as El Bananero, is an Uruguayan-American humorist, producer and Internet celebrity who is known for creating and uploading videos that contain irreverent humor and obscene language.

Biography
El Bananero was born in Elizabeth, New Jersey. When he was eight years old, he moved to Montevideo, Uruguay where he acquired citizenship from his parents. He lived there until he moved to Miami, Florida in 2005.

While his parents were at work, he was left alone at home, where he recorded pornography from adult cable television channels to show to his friends.

Internet phenomenon

Beginning
In 2005, El Bananero decided to make videos to have fun with his friends. His content generally includes humour that is satirical, irreverent, foul, sexist, scatological, and obscene. He mocks taboo subjects such as sex and performs parodies of famous movies with his montage. His acts captured significant online attention in Latin America. He created his website, elbananero.com, to upload his videos and share them. A year later, when YouTube was established, he started a channel there, which quickly became popular among adolescents.

Videos
Among his popular content are the "Trailerazos," which are videos in trailer format that parody famous Hollywood movies, including El Hombre Que araña ("The Man Who Scratches," spoofing Spider-Man), Harry el Sucio Potter ("Harry The Dirty Potter," parodying Harry Potter) and El Impotente Hulk ("The Impotent Hulk," parodying The Incredible Hulk).

The Iván el Trolazo Trailerazo (parodying the animated series He-Man) led to a lawsuit by Mattel, which shut down El Bananero's YouTube channel. He opened another channel which reached a million subscribers in 2016. His videos often show sexual organs, which led to their frequent removal by YouTube. His videos have been re-uploaded with censors.

In January 2015, El Bananero surprised his followers by posting a photograph with one of the most popular pornstars of the time, Mia Khalifa. He then uploaded a video for his channel called Mia Khalifa vs. La Muñeca Psicótica System (Mia Khalifa vs. the Psychotic Doll System).

Latin American shows
In addition to earning a living as an audiovisual producer and YouTuber, he also performed stand-up comedy tours in Latin America. Since 2014, he's performed in Peru, Colombia,  Panama, Costa Rica, Argentina, Ecuador, Mexico, Uruguay, Chile, and Bolivia.

In 2016, El Bananero showed a penis drawn on his chest in a live television interview for CNN Chile, saying that he wanted to share this on CNN before saying goodbye.

References

1976 births
Living people
People from Elizabeth, New Jersey
American people of Uruguayan descent
People with acquired Uruguayan citizenship
American YouTubers
American parodists
Uruguayan Internet celebrities
Internet memes
Comedy YouTubers